Ammonium phosphate is the inorganic compound with the formula (NH4)3PO4. It is the ammonium salt of orthophosphoric acid. A related "double salt", (NH4)3PO4.(NH4)2HPO4 is also recognized but is impractical to use. Both triammonium salts evolve ammonia. In contrast to the unstable nature of the triammonium salts, the diammonium phosphate (NH4)2HPO4 and monoammonium salt (NH4)H2PO4 are stable materials that are commonly used as fertilizers to provide plants with fixed nitrogen and phosphorus.

Preparation of triammonium phosphate
Triammonium phosphate can be prepared in the laboratory by treating 85% phosphoric acid with 30% ammonia solution:

H3PO4 + 3 NH3 → (NH4)3PO4

(NH4)3PO4 is a colorless, crystalline solid. The solid, which has the odor of ammonia, is readily soluble in water. The salt converts to diammonium hydrogen phosphate (NH4)2HPO4.

See also
 Ammonium polyphosphate
 Monoammonium phosphate
 Diammonium phosphate

References

Phosphates
Ammonium compounds
Inorganic fertilizers